Carine Gindt  (born 23 June 1972) is a Luxembourgian retired footballer. She was a member of the Luxembourg women's national football team from 18 November 2006 to 29 October 2008 and played in 11 matches.

References

External links
 

1972 births
Living people
Luxembourgian women's footballers
Place of birth missing (living people)
Luxembourg women's international footballers
Women's association football midfielders